This is a list of electoral results for the electoral district of Mirrabooka in Western Australian state elections.

Members for Mirrabooka

Election results

Elections in the 2020s

Elections in the 2010s

Elections in the 1970s

Elections in the 1960s

References

Western Australian state electoral results by district